Yanjing Beer 2018 Chinese FA Cup (Chinese: 燕京啤酒2018中国足球协会杯) was the 20th edition of the Chinese FA Cup. On 29 December 2017, Yanjing Beer extended their sponsorship contract for another four years (2018–2021).

Schedule
The schedule was as follows.

Home Advantage Decision
According to Chinese FA Cup Procedure, in each round, home team advantages are decided as follows.

Qualifying rounds

Association ranking
For the 2018 Chinese FA Cup Preliminary Round, the local football associations are allocated places according to the total number of FA Cup matches of all amateur clubs associated to local FAs from 2011 to 2016. Shanghai Jiading Boji, who advanced to the third round of 2017 Chinese FA Cup, and the champions and the runners-up of 2017 "I Love Football" Chinese Football Nongovernmental Championships would join the Qualifying Round directly.

Preliminary round
29 teams registered to participate in the qualifying rounds of the 2018 Chinese FA Cup. Teams ranked 9–13 in the north group and Teams ranked 6–17 in the south group participated in this round.

North Group

South Group

Qualifying round
Teams ranked 1–8 in the north group, teams ranked 1–5 in the south group, 8 preliminary round winners, Shanghai Huajiao and Hangzhou Wuyue Qiantang, the champions and the runners-up of 2017 "I Love Football" Chinese Football Nongovernmental Championships and Shanghai Jiading Boji, who advanced to the third round of 2017 Chinese FA Cup will participate in this round. Hangzhou Wuyue Qiantang, already qualified as top five teams in the south group, left a vacancy which was filled by Nanchang Teneng. Shenyang West Winner, already qualified as top eight teams in the north group, withdrew and replaced by Chifeng Hongshan Shire.

Format
Format of Qualifying Round was a variation of Double-elimination tournament with three rounds as follows.
Round 1: Team 1 VS Team 2; Team 3 VS Team 4
Round 2: Winners from the Round 1 would compete against each other and the winner would qualify and be ranked the 1st; Losers from the Round 1 would compete against each other and the loser would be eliminated and  ranked the 4th.
Round 3: The remaining two teams would compete against each other and the winner would qualify and be ranked the 2nd while the loser would be eliminated and ranked the 3rd.

Group A

Group B

Group C

Group D

Group E

Group F

First round
Shenzhen Pengcheng and Sichuan Jiuniu replaced Qiqihaer Zhongjian Bituminous Concrete and Lhasa Urban Construction Investment who withdrew from 2018 China League Two in the original draw.

Second round
Baotou Nanjiao and Fujian Tianxin replaced Chengdu Qbao and Shanghai JuJu Sports who withdrew from 2018 China League Two in the original draw.

Notes

Third round

Notes

Fourth round

Fifth Round

Bracket (quarter-finals onwards)

Quarter-finals

1st Leg

2nd Leg

Dalian Yifang won 5–0 on aggregate.

Shandong Luneng Taishan won 3–0 on aggregate.

3–3 on aggregate. Beijing Sinobo Guoan won 5–4 on penalties.

Guangzhou R&F won 3–2 on aggregate.

Semi-finals

1st Leg

2nd Leg

Shandong Luneng Taishan won 4–0 on aggregate.

Beijing Sinobo Guoan won 8–1 on aggregate.

Final

1st Leg

2nd Leg

3–3 on aggregate. Beijing Sinobo Guoan won on away goals.

Awards
 Top Scorer:  Jonathan Viera (Beijing Sinobo Guoan) (5 goals)
 Most Valuable Player:  Zhang Xizhe (Beijing Sinobo Guoan)
 Fair Play Award: Sichuan Jiuniu
 Dark Horse Award: Shenyang Urban

Most Valuable Player of The Round

Notes

References

External links
 Regulations of 2018 Chinese FA Cup Qualifying Rounds 

2018
2018 in Chinese football
2018 domestic association football cups